Turpentine bush may refer to:
Australian plants
Acacia lysiphloia, also known as the turpentine wattle
Beyeria lechenaultia, pale turpentine bush
Beyeria opaca, dark turpentine bush
Beyeria subtecta, Kangaroo Island turpentine bush
Eremophila clarkei
Eremophila sturtii

Other plants
Ericameria laricifolia, native to the southwestern United States and northern Mexico

See also
 Scrub turpentine
 Turpentine tree